Kastanoussa, known before 1926 as Palmes, (known as pulses up to 1926) is a village in Serres with a population of 592 inhabitants as recorded in the 2011 census. The village and community belongs to the municipality of Sintiki .

Geography 
The village is located in the southern foothills of Belasitsa, near the Bulgarian-North Macedonian border.

History

In the Ottoman Empire 
In 1891 Georgi Strezov wrote:

According to the statistics of Vasil Kanchov ("Macedonia. Ethnography and Statistics") by 1900 "Palmesh" ("Palmesha") is a Bulgarian Muslims' settlement . 1150 Bulgarian Muslims were living there at the time.

Under Greek sovereignty 
During the First Balkan War the village was under Bulgarian control, but after the Second Balkan War in 1913 it was incorporated within Greece.

References

Bibliography

External links

 Aerial photo of Kastanoussa

Populated places in Serres (regional unit)